Palmer W. Collins (June 9, 1930 – May 21, 2018) was an American politician. He served as a Democratic member of the Florida House of Representatives.

Life and career 
Collins was born in McMinn County, Tennessee. He attended Palm Beach Lakes Community High School, Anderson College and the University of Florida Levin College of Law.

In 1966, Collins was elected to the Florida House of Representatives, serving until 1967.

Collins died in May 2018, at the age of 87.

References 

1930 births
2018 deaths
People from McMinn County, Tennessee
Democratic Party members of the Florida House of Representatives
20th-century American politicians
Fredric G. Levin College of Law alumni